Querença is a former civil parish in the municipality of Loulé,  eastern Algarve, Portugal. In 2013, the parish merged into the new parish Querença, Tôr e Benafim.

History
Due to the creation of the parish of Tôr, in 1997, Querença was reduced in its geographic extent.

Geography

Situated on a hilltop, that provides the parish with its name, the parish is in the transitional area between the Barrocal and the mountains. Many of the parishes' homes descend these slopes, in many directions.

Fonte da Benémola covers an area of 392 hectares, intersected by the Ribeira de Menalva, an affluent that maintains 60% of its flow throughout the year.

Architecture

Civic
 Fountain of Benemola
 Lime Kilns of Fonte Benémola
 Roman Bridge of Tôr
 Water Mill of Fonte Benémola

Religious
 Church of Nossa Senhora da Assunção

Culture
The parish is famous for its arbutus, producing an appreciated sausage, along with other varieties. The Festa das Chouriças is, among others, one of the high points of the parish's annual festivities, in Querença. Local gastronomy is preserved by many of the restaurants, including: Galinha Cerejada, Galo de Cabidela and Xerém (a maize porridge, traditional in the Algarve).

References

Villages in the Algarve